Khurram Shahzad (born 25 October 1988) is a cricketer who plays for the Qatar national cricket team. He was named in Qatar's squad for the 2017 ICC World Cricket League Division Five tournament in South Africa. He played in Qatar's opening fixture, against the Cayman Islands, on 3 September 2017. In September 2019, he was named in Qatar's squad for the 2019 Malaysia Cricket World Cup Challenge League A tournament. He made his List A debut for Qatar, against Singapore, in the Cricket World Cup Challenge League A tournament on 17 September 2019.

In February 2020, he was named in Qatar's team for their three-match Twenty20 International (T20I) series against Uganda. He made his T20I debut for Qatar, against Uganda, on 12 February 2020.

References

External links
 

1988 births
Living people
Qatari cricketers
Qatar Twenty20 International cricketers
Pakistani expatriates in Qatar
Place of birth missing (living people)